This article covers the results and statistics of FC Thun during the 2004–05 season. During the season Thun competed in the Swiss Super League and the Swiss Cup.

Season summary

FC Thun finished second in Swiss Super League.

Squad
Fabio Coltorti
Alain Portmann
Pascal Cerrone
Armand Deumi
Sandro Galli
Selver Hodzic
Ljubo Miličević
David Pallas
Lukas Schenkel
Sehid Sinani
Silvan Aegerter
Andres Gerber
Baykal Kulaksizoglu
Nelson Ferreira
Mario Raimondi
Michel Renggli
Nenad Savić
Fabian Stoller
Gelson Rodrigues
Mauro Lustrinelli
Adrian Moser
Samuel Ojong

Swiss cup

Round 1
Teams from Super League and Challenge League were seeded in this round. In a match, the home advantage was granted to the team from the lower league, if applicable.

|colspan="3" style="background-color:#99CCCC"|17 September 2004

|-
|colspan="3" style="background-color:#99CCCC"|18 September 2004

 

|-
|colspan="3" style="background-color:#99CCCC"|19 September 2004

|}

Round 2

|colspan="3" style="background-color:#99CCCC"|22 October 2004

|-
|colspan="3" style="background-color:#99CCCC"|23 October 2004

|-
|colspan="3" style="background-color:#99CCCC"|24 October 2004

 

|}

Round 3

|colspan="3" style="background-color:#99CCCC"|20 November 2004

|-
|colspan="3" style="background-color:#99CCCC"|21 November 2004

 

|}

Quarterfinals

References

External links

FC Thun seasons
Thun